Ray Douglas McDonald (May 7, 1944 – May 4, 1993) was a professional football player, a running back in the National Football League for the Washington Redskins for two seasons, from 1967–68.

Early life and high school
McDonald was born in McKinney, a segregated suburb of Dallas. After years in McKinney, he began high school in Alamogordo, New Mexico, and then moved to Caldwell, Idaho, after his sophomore year. A three-sport star for the Cougars for two years, he graduated from Caldwell High School in 1963.

Career as college athlete
McDonald enrolled at the University of Idaho in Moscow in 1963 and his family moved north from Caldwell to nearby Lewiston. On the mandatory freshman team his first semester, he led the Vandals to convincing wins over the freshman teams of Washington (32–18) and Washington State (36–0). (Freshmen were ineligible for NCAA varsity participation until the early 1970s.) McDonald missed the first three games of his sophomore season after tearing his Achilles tendon in a pick-up basketball game in late June. As a speedy fullback for the varsity as a sophomore, he was dubbed "Thunder Ray" after his first Battle of the Palouse game the first Vandal victory over neighboring WSU in a decade. (Idaho repeated over the Cougars in Pullman in 1965 for the first time in forty years, and would've swept three straight, but lost a late lead in the Moscow mud in 1966).

As a senior in 1966, he led the nation in rushing with 1,329 yards, capping it with 255 yards in his final game. He rushed for 36 touchdowns and 2,916 yards in 27 games played as a Vandal, an average of 108 yards per game.

McDonald was timed in the 100-yard dash at 9.9 seconds and was a first-team All-American.  He threw the shot put and discus and was a national-class hurdler on the Vandal track team.

McDonald played both offense and defense in at the East–West Shrine Game, as well as the piano at  Shriners Hospital, and saw significant playing time at fullback in the Senior Bowl the following week.

Professional football career
McDonald was selected in the first round of the 1967 NFL Draft by the Washington Redskins, as the 13th overall pick, a personal choice by owner Edward Bennett Williams.  He signed a three-year, guaranteed contract for $100,000.

Personal life
In 1968, McDonald was arrested by Washington, D.C. police for having sex with a man in public. Injuries also played a part in cutting his career short, and by 1969 he was out of pro football.

McDonald eventually became a junior high music teacher.  After an extended battle, he died of complications due to AIDS at Parkland Hospital in Dallas, on May 4, 1993, three days before his 49th birthday, with a body weight less than half of his NFL playing weight.  The cause of death was originally reported as complications from sickle cell anemia.

See also

Homosexuality in American football
 List of college football yearly rushing leaders

References

External links
University of Idaho – Vandal Athletics Hall of Fame – Ray McDonald
Gem of the Mountains, 1967 University of Idaho yearbook – Athletics

1944 births
1993 deaths
African-American players of American football
AIDS-related deaths in Texas
American football running backs
LGBT players of American football
Idaho Vandals football players
LGBT African Americans
American LGBT sportspeople
People from Caldwell, Idaho
People from McKinney, Texas
Washington Redskins players
LGBT people from Texas
Gay sportsmen
20th-century African-American sportspeople
20th-century American LGBT people